Hermann Densch (1887–1963) was an Admiral in the Kriegsmarine during World War II.  From September 1937 to October 1939, he served as the Navy's Commander of Surface Craft.  Densch had previously served as an officer of the Reichsmarine.

See also
 Peking Plan

References

 Dermot Bradley (Hrsg.), Hans H. Hildebrand, Ernest Henriot: Deutschlands Admirale 1849–1945. Die militärischen Werdegänge der See-, Ingenieur-, Sanitäts-, Waffen- und Verwaltungsoffiziere im Admiralsrang. Band 1: A–G. Biblio Verlag. Osnabrück 1988. . S. 236–237.

Admirals of the Kriegsmarine
1887 births
1963 deaths